Bhawana (also spelled as Bhowana) is a city and capital of Bhawana Tehsil of Chiniot District in Punjab, Pakistan. It is located on the bank of the Chenab river, bounded by Faisalabad, Jhang, and Chiniot, three other cities in Punjab.

History 
Bhawana is one of the ancient cities of Pakistan. The Mughal Emperor Zahir-ud-din Babur mentions the area in his book the Tuzk-e-Babari for its fine architecture and finely handcrafted jharoka windows of many of the old havelis (manors) and other buildings of the old/medieval town.

Geography and climate 
Bhawana is located by the side of Jhang Chiniot road and on the left bank of the Chenab river. Recently, with a budget of 250 million rupees, a bridge from Bhawana to Kalri has been constructed over the Chenab river. Leaders of opposition political parties specially Imran Khan and Billawal Bhutto have criticised the Chief Minister Punjab Shabaz Sharif for spending such a huge amount on a bridge to benefit CM' owned Ramzan Sugar Mills. Its soil is very fertile and is among the largest agricultural areas, and the city itself depends considerably on agriculture to bolster its economy. It is situated 37 km from Chiniot, 50 km from Faisalabad, 48 km from Jhang and 70 km from Sargodha. Its weather is much like the rest of Pakistan's, with summer, spring, winter and autumn seasons. Its temperatures are usually moderate.

Visiting places 
 Dost Muhammad Lali Bridge
 Karodiya Park

Famous personalities
 Saqlain Anwar Sipra (born 1977), former MPA
 Haji Shaukat Ali Lohar (born 1972), politician

See also 

 Economy of Faisalabad
 List of schools in Pakistan
 Mandi Shah Jeewna
 Sheikhan
 Sial Sharif
 Sultan Bahu

References

External links 
 Bhawana at the Google Maps

Chiniot District
Populated places in Chiniot District
Cities in Punjab (Pakistan)